Traiguera is a town and municipality in the Baix Maestrat comarca, province of Castelló, Valencian Community, Spain. It is part of the Taula del Sénia free association of municipalities.

The town is located in a central position in the comarca, north of the Muntanyes de Cervera. The Serra de Sant Pere mountain range rises on the western side of Traiguera. This town was mentioned as part of Ilercavonia by Ptolemy.

Besides Mediterranean agriculture, mainly almonds, olives and oranges, the town has a traditional ceramic industry, much affected now by the current crisis. The name of the place 'Traiguera' comes from Aegilops geniculata, a coarse cereal that was cultivated until the Middle Ages.

One of the main tourist attractions is the Santuari de la Font de la Salut, located among mountains 2 km south of the town.

Villages
Traiguera
Font de la Salut 
Masia Avenc

References

External links

 Web oficial de l'Ajuntament de Traiguera
 Informació de Traiguera
 Imatge de Traiguera: Memòria visual del Segle XX
 País Valencià, poble a poble, comarca a comarca, de Paco González Ramírez, d'on se n'ha tret informació amb el seu consentiment.
 Institut Valencià d'Estadística.
 Portal de la Direcció General d'Administració Local de la Generalitat.

Municipalities in the Province of Castellón
Baix Maestrat